Ro15-4513 (IUPAC: Ethyl-8-azido-5,6-dihydro-5-methyl-6-oxo-4H-imidazo-1,4-benzodiazepine-3-carboxylate) is a weak partial inverse agonist of the benzodiazepine class of drugs, developed by Hoffmann–La Roche in the 1980s. It acts as a inverse agonist (which acts in a similar way as a competitive antagonist), and can therefore be an antidote to the acute impairment caused by alcohols, including ethanol, isopropanol, tert-butyl alcohol, tert-amyl alcohol, 3-methyl-3-pentanol, methylpentynol and ethchlorvynol.

Ro15-4513 is structurally related to the benzodiazepine antidote flumazenil.

Uses

Original development as alcohol antidote
The main interest in Ro15-4513 was as an antidote to alcohol. Flumazenil effectively blocks the effects of benzodiazepine agonists such as alprazolam and diazepam and so is used for treating overdoses of these drugs but is ineffective in blocking alcohol actions. Ro15-4513 was somewhat less effective than flumazenil at blocking the effects of benzodiazepines, but instead selectively blocked the effects of ethanol. This meant that in contrast to flumazenil, which is ineffective at treating alcohol overdoses, Ro15-4513 showed potential as a useful alcohol antidote. It is thought that Ro15-4513 antagonizes the effects of ethanol because the azido group at the 8- position of the benzene ring blocks the binding site for ethanol on the α5β3δ subtype of the GABAA receptor; flumazenil, which has a fluorine at this position, does not block this binding site and so does not counteract the effects of ethanol.

Unfortunately Ro15-4513 had several disadvantages that made it unsuitable for development and marketing. Its fairly short half-life means that several repeated doses would have to be given over an extended period, since if only one dose were used it would wear off before the alcohol had been metabolised and the patient would relapse (similar to the problems with renarcotization seen when treating overdoses of long-acting opioids such as methadone with short-acting antagonists such as naloxone). Also because of its GABA antagonist effects, Ro15-4513 causes serious side-effects including both anxiety, and at higher doses, convulsions, which would require careful control of dosing and would cause complications in clinical use. Another problem is that alcohol's effects are not purely mediated by GABA receptors; at higher doses alcohol binds to several other targets as well, so while Ro15-4513 is an effective antidote against moderate levels of alcohol intoxication, it might be ineffective at treating life-threatening overdoses.

Also, Roche was concerned about the legal implications of introducing an alcohol antidote, as Ro15-4513 blocks the effects of ethanol but does not remove it from the bloodstream, which could lead to potential problems, as the effects of the alcohol would be masked only temporarily. As a result, patients might, for instance, feel that they are sober and discharge themselves from hospital once the drug took effect, then become drunk again once it wore off, possibly crashing their car or having other accidents that might lead to legal consequences for Roche.

However, the discovery of Ro15-4513 has been important in elucidating the mechanism of action of ethanol as used as a recreational drug, and this compound could now be used as a template to design a more effective and longer-lasting antidote for ethanol, or alternatively to develop a selective agonist drug that could replicate the desired effects of alcohol, but with fewer side effects.

Current use in PET Imaging
Labelling Ro15-4513 with carbon-11 leads to the possibility of its use in PET imaging of the brain. The specificity of the compound to a small number of GABA receptor sub-types leads to the generation, with accurate modelling, of detailed images with well-defined limbic and cortical structures. These images can be useful in quantitatively analysing conditions such as addiction, that are known to be, at least in part, associated with the GABAergic system. The images produced are similar to those for labelled flumazenil, though the distribution varies especially in regions such as the occipital lobe, cerebellum, and basal ganglia, as it does not selectively label the GABRA1 subtype.

See also
 GABAA receptor negative allosteric modulator
 GABAA receptor § Ligands

References

Antidotes
Organoazides
Carboxylate esters
GABAA receptor negative allosteric modulators
Hoffmann-La Roche brands
Imidazobenzodiazepines
Lactams
Convulsants